The Lady in the Van is a 2015 British comedy-drama film directed by Nicholas Hytner, and starring Maggie Smith and Alex Jennings, based on the memoir of the same name created by Alan Bennett. It was written by Bennett, and it tells the (mostly) true story of his interactions with Mary Shepherd, an elderly woman who lived in a dilapidated van on his driveway in London for 15 years. He had previously published the story as a 1989 essay, 1990 book, 1999 stage play, and 2009 radio play on BBC Radio 4. Smith had previously portrayed Shepherd twice: in the 1999 stage play, which earned her a Best Actress nomination at the 2000 Olivier Awards, and in the 2009 radio adaptation.

Hytner directed the 1999 stage play at the Queen's Theatre in London. The film was shown in the Special Presentations section of the 2015 Toronto International Film Festival and received largely positive reviews from critics.

Plot
The Lady in the Van tells the mostly true story of Alan Bennett's somewhat strained friendship with Miss Mary Shepherd, an irritable, eccentric, homeless woman whom Bennett befriended in the 1970s, before letting her park her Bedford van in the driveway of his Camden home "for three months". She ended up residing there for 15 years.

As the story develops, Bennett learns Miss Shepherd's true identity: Margaret Fairchild, a gifted former pupil of pianist Alfred Cortot. She had driven an ambulance in WWII, played Chopin at The Proms, attempted to become a nun twice, and was committed to an institution by her brother. She escaped, had an accident when her van was hit by a motorcyclist—for whose death she believed herself to blame—and thereafter lived in fear of arrest.

Social workers check in with her, the first offering her coats, then confiding in Mr. Bennett she would just as soon see her move on. Other than Bennett, other neighbours on the street would bring Miss Shepherd presents or food, in doing so being charitable in their eyes.

Bennett discovered to his surprise she had studied piano in France, and was fluent in French. Also, from time to time, a mysterious man stops by her van who frightens her, and she gives him money.

One day, a couple of youth scare Miss Shepherd, shaking the van and yelling at her. They woke her from a nightmare she was having of a long ago traffic accident. She goes to confession, and the priest reminds her he has absolved her several times already. The incident with the boys worries Alan, so he mentions at a meal with neighbors an idea to let her park in his drive. A wealthy neighbour buys her a new van, and it stays on Alan's property for the next 15 years.

Mary has an aversion to all music. When asked why, she explained that when she was a novice nun, left alone in a room with a piano she started to play a classical piece. She was forbidden to play it again. Another unusual experience she mentions is driving an ambulance during the 1939 blackout.

From time to time, she takes a trip to Broadstairs on the coast, visiting a cottage with a blue door, speaking with a man. Once she's gone to the day centre, Bennett goes to the person she's named next of kin. Her brother in Broadstairs fills him in on the details: she'd tried to be a nun twice, he had had her institutionalised in Banstead (however, she escaped), she'd studied under the virtuoso pianist Alfred Cortot.

He returns home, to find her back. She had been scared off by a woman she'd known in Banstead, and had an opportunity to sneak in to play a piano in the centre. She retells that her confessor (in addition to the nuns) had forbade her from playing, which she was told would help her spirit grow. Before he goes into his home, she asks to hold his hand. It was her final goodbye to him; she dies peacefully in her sleep in her van.

Much of the dialogue is between two versions of Bennett – his "real self" and his "writer self".

During her 15-year stay in his drive, Bennett balances his writing career with watching over Shepherd and providing for his increasingly invalid mother. Though he denies "caring" for anyone, he slowly becomes aware of his growing friendship with Shepherd. After her passing, Alan decides to write a memoir covering the years he has known her.

In 2014, the real Bennett is shown observing this film's final scene being filmed, with his younger self unveiling a blue plaque on his home dedicated to "The Lady in the Van". This scene is fictional, as this blue plaque has never existed.

Cast
 Maggie Smith as Miss Mary Shepherd / Margaret Fairchild
 Alex Jennings as both versions of Alan Bennett
 Clare Hammond as young Margaret Fairchild
 Roger Allam as Rufus
 Deborah Findlay as Pauline
 Gwen Taylor as Mum
 Frances de la Tour as Ursula Vaughan Williams
 David Calder as Leo Fairchild
 Jim Broadbent as Underwood
 Claire Foy as Lois
 Cecilia Noble as Miss Briscoe
 Nicholas Burns as Giles Perry
 Pandora Colin as Mrs Perry
 Clive Merrison as Man in Confessional

The principal cast of Bennett's 2006 film The History Boys appear in cameo roles, with the exception of that film's "teachers", de la Tour, who has a more prominent role in this film, and Richard Griffiths, who died in 2013. This includes the "temporary teacher" (Moore) and all the "students" from that earlier film: Samuel Barnett (as Donald), Samuel Anderson (as a Jehovah's Witness), Stephen Campbell Moore (as a doctor), Dominic Cooper (as a theatre actor), James Corden (as a street trader), Sacha Dhawan (as Doctor Malik), Andrew Knott (as an ambulance driver), Clive Merrison (as a man attending confession), Jamie Parker (as an estate agent), and Russell Tovey (as a man with an earring).

Production

Development
The Lady in the Van was greenlit on 3 June 2014, with TriStar Productions and BBC Films working together to make the film adaptation of Alan Bennett's West End hit. TriStar won the film rights to handle worldwide distribution, while the BBC was the first to show the film on television in the UK. The involvement of Maggie Smith and Nicholas Hytner was announced simultaneously with the film, but they were attached to the project as early as 9 May (coincidentally Bennett's 80th birthday). Both of them had collaborated with Bennett in the past; Hytner on The Madness of King George in 1994, and the film adaptation of The History Boys (in 2006), while Smith had  portrayed Miss Shepherd in the original theatre production in 1999, and again in a 2009 radio adaptation by BBC Radio 4.

Filming

Principal photography began at 23 Gloucester Crescent (51.538681, −0.145635) in north London in October 2014. The film was shot in and around Bennett's old house in Camden Town, where the real Miss Shepherd spent 15 years on his driveway. According to Hytner, they never considered [filming] anywhere else, and it was entertaining to see the look on all the residents’ faces; many of whom were there when the van drove down the crescent. Filming was a difficult experience for Smith because she spent most of her time confined to one van or another. According to Smith, the van was not the most comfortable of places, and the film was much more concentrated than the play; the stage version was more physically demanding, but Smith admitted it was "a long time ago and [she] could handle it back then." She joked that not a lot of method [acting] was required when one was dressed as [she] was, and in a van.

The production crew filmed for two days in November 2014 in Broadstairs in the Isle of Thanet, Kent, notably Viking Bay, featuring Morelli's Gelato and the Palace Cinema. Producer Kevin Loader described Viking Bay as "the perfect location" and said the area had benefited by £40,000, as the 50-strong crew stayed locally and took advantage of the various restaurants and bars. Buckmaster House in Broadstairs, the only filming location outside London, was featured as Bennett's mother's nursing home in Weston-super-Mare. The scenes which take place in church were filmed at the Church of St Silas the Martyr in Kentish Town.

Music

The film's score consists of classical music by Chopin and others; some additional music was composed by George Fenton. It was released as a soundtrack album through Sony Classical Records, a subsidiary of Sony Music Entertainment, on 6 November 2015 in the United Kingdom. This was followed by an 11 December release in the United States.

Release
The worldwide premiere was held on 12 September 2015, at the Toronto International Film Festival. This was followed by the UK premiere on 13 October at the 59th BFI London Film Festival; which, in turn, was succeeded by the US premiere on 15 November, at the 38th Denver International Film Festival. It was released in UK cinemas on 13 November 2015, while there was a limited theatrical release on 15 January 2016 in the US.

Marketing
The first trailer was released on 26 February 2015, followed by a teaser poster on 5 March. A new and extended trailer was released on 4 September.

Reception

Box office
, The Lady in the Van had grossed $US41.3 million worldwide; $US31.3 million in the United Kingdom.

Critical reception
The Lady in the Van received positive reviews, with particular praise being aimed at Smith's acting. Rotten Tomatoes gave the film a rating of 89%, based on 149 reviews, with an average rating of 7.21/10. The site's consensus states, "Led by a marvelous performance from Maggie Smith, Lady in the Van wrings poignant, often hilarious insight from its fact-based source material." On Metacritic the film holds a score of 70 out of 100, based on 30 critics, indicating "generally favourable reviews".

Guy Lodge, of Variety magazine, attended the worldwide premiere at the Toronto International Film Festival. After the screening, he described Smith's portrayal of Mary Shepherd as "one of the most tailor-made leading roles of her late career". Even though, he says, the film is "low on narrative drive" and "marred by a misjudged final act", "Hytner's amiable [love] fest" is "enlivened by Smith’s signature irascibility; silver-dollar auds should turn up, if not in droves, at least in healthy vanloads". Frank Scheck, of The Hollywood Reporter, also attended the premiere, and like Lodge, he felt Smith's character was the "driving force" behind the film. Not to his surprise, Smith "fully exploits the humour in her character's bizarreness". For example, when her character "receives guidance from the Virgin Mary; her utter obliviousness to her lack of personal hygiene; her hatred of the sound of music that sends her fleeing whenever she hears a note; and her ragtag wardrobe which has been assembled from various dumpsters". In spite of the humour, Scheck praised Smith for "subtly convey[ing] the emotional pain and desperation of [an] addled old woman, especially in the scenes [where she is] taken away by social services and gently treated to a thorough washing, feeding and medical examination".

Ian Nathan, of Empire magazine, awarded the film four out of five stars. Like many, he applauded Smith's "liberating" role, describing her as "shrill and hilarious, but not a joke". He also commended the directing, saying: "Unshowy to a fault, Hytner delivers a fine, moving comedy of English manners between a writer and his eccentric tenant, which slowly deepens into an exploration of human bonds". In a similar fashion, Peter Bradshaw, of The Guardian, awarded four out of five stars and called it an "enjoyable film from Nicholas Hytner". While he felt Smith's performance – "honed from previous stage and radio" adaptations – was "terrifically good", he praised Jennings for giving a "sharp and sympathetic performance as Bennett".

Donald Clarke, of The Irish Times, awarded the film three out of five stars. He said Smith's role is "indecently appropriate", while de la Tour's is "fabulous", and Allam's is "equally as good" as the latter's. The "problem" with the film is "that, like Miss Shepherd’s van, the story rarely" moves on. It remains "gracelessly the same throughout", with "narrative details" being "plucked like unattached footnotes". When the characters do "open up", during a "bafflingly appalling final scene", you "rather wish the doors had remained shut". Also awarding three out of five stars, Stella Papamichael, of the Radio Times, had similar feelings. She said: Smith and Jennings' characters "veer close to a moment of pathos towards the end [of the film], but [it's not] too profound. The social awkwardness [leaves] a more lingering impression" on the audience.

Jesse Hassenger, of The A.V. Club was critical, stating  The Lady in the Van is flawed because the film is "supposed to be revealing Bennett, not Shepherd"; a fact that many "will be reminded of before the film’s end". Smith's character is very commanding on screen, while Jennings "honorably tend[s] to his character’s quiet, semi-closeted homosexuality". No "matter how many meaningful considerations of mortality" are thrown his way; through the screenplay, Jennings "doesn't have a chance" against Smith. On the contrary, Slant Magazine's Elise Nakhnikian said the film is all about the "fastidious, somewhat timid, and reclusive playwright Alan Bennett", and stated the film's "annoying glibness is neatly summarized" by the line: "In life, going downhill is an uphill job".

Accolades

References

External links
 
 
 
 

2015 films
2015 comedy-drama films
2015 independent films
BBC Film films
British comedy-drama films
British independent films
Comedy-drama films based on actual events
2010s English-language films
Films about homelessness
Films about poverty in the United Kingdom
Films about writers
British films based on plays
Films directed by Nicholas Hytner
Films scored by George Fenton
Films set in England
Films set in London
Films set in the 1970s
Films set in the 1980s
Films shot in London
Films with screenplays by Alan Bennett
Sony Pictures Classics films
TriStar Pictures films
2010s British films